Rashid Alimov, also referred to as Rashid Qutbiddinovich Alimov or Rashid Qutbiddinovich Olimov, (born 23 June 1953) is the former minister of Foreign Affairs of the Republic of Tajikistan from 1992 to 1994. He was also the Permanent Representative of Tajikistan to the United Nations from 1994 to 2005, Tajikistan's ambassador to China from 2005 to 2015, and the Secretary-General of the Shanghai Cooperation Organisation from 2016 to 2018.

Career
Alimov was born in Stalinabad (now Dushanbe). He studied history at the Tajik National University, graduating in 1975. He continued to study social sciences at the Academy of Sciences of the Soviet Union, where he earned a doctorate in political science. He became the deputy chair of Tajik National University's joint trade union committee, and spent much of the 1970s working in various positions for the Komsomol and the Communist Party of Tajikistan. In the early 1990s he was a youth representative at the Supreme Soviet of the Tajik SSR, and an advisor to the president of Tajikistan. In 1994 he was named Tajikistan's permanent representative to the United Nations, a post he held until 2005. That year, he became Tajikistan's ambassador to China, working in that role until 2015.

In 2017, Alimov worked as the Secretary-General of the Shanghai Cooperation Organisation. While there, he wrote the book SCO: Global Profile in International Relations.

Selected works
SCO: Global Profile in International Relations (2018)
"The Shanghai Cooperation Organisation: Its role and place in the development of Eurasia", Journal of Eurasian studies (2018)

References

1953 births
Living people
Foreign ministers of Tajikistan
Ambassadors of Tajikistan to China
Permanent Representatives of Tajikistan to the United Nations
Tajikistani political scientists
Tajik National University alumni
People from Dushanbe